Mitch Bolinsky (born September 17, 1958) is an American politician who has served in the Connecticut House of Representatives from the 106th district since 2013.

References

1958 births
Living people
Politicians from Queens, New York
21st-century American politicians
Republican Party members of the Connecticut House of Representatives